The 1872–73 United States Senate elections were held on various dates in various states, coinciding with President Ulysses S. Grant's re-election. As these U.S. Senate elections were prior to the ratification of the Seventeenth Amendment in 1913, senators were chosen by state legislatures. Senators were elected over a wide range of time throughout 1872 and 1873, and a seat may have been filled months late or remained vacant due to legislative deadlock. In these elections, terms were up for the senators in Class 3.

The Republican Party, while still retaining a commanding majority, lost two seats. By the beginning of the Congress, however, they would lose three more: two as defections to the Liberal Republican Party, and one a resignation of Henry Wilson to become U.S. Vice President. This remains the last election in which Republicans held a 2/3rds majority in the Senate.

Results summary 
Senate party division, 43rd Congress (1873–1875)

 Majority party: Republican (50–51)
 Minority party: Democratic (19–20)
 Other parties: Liberal Republican (3–2)
 Vacant: (2–1)
 Total seats: 74

Change in composition

Before the elections 
After the January 30, 1872 special election in North Carolina.

Result of the elections

Beginning of the next Congress

Race summaries

Special elections during the 42nd Congress 
In these elections, the winners were seated during 1872 or in 1873 before March 4; ordered by election date.

Races leading to the 43rd Congress 
In these regular elections, the winners were elected for the term beginning March 4, 1873; ordered by state.

All of the elections involved the Class 3 seats.

Elections during the 43rd Congress 

In this election, the winner was elected in 1873 after March 4.

Early election

Alabama

Arkansas

California

California (regular, class 3)

California (special)

California (early)

Connecticut

Florida

Georgia

Illinois

Indiana

Iowa

Kansas

Kentucky

Kentucky (regular)

Kentucky (special)

Louisiana

Louisiana (special)

Louisiana (regular)

Maryland 

George R. Dennis was elected by a margin of 75.27%, or 70 votes, for the Class 3 seat.

Massachusetts (special)

Missouri

Nevada

New Hampshire

New York 

 
The New York election was held January 21, 1873. Republican Roscoe Conkling had been elected in January 1867 to this seat, and his term would expire on March 3, 1873.

At the State election in November 1871, 21 Republicans and 11 Democrats were elected for a two-year term (1872-1873) in the State Senate. In 1872, a faction of the Republican Party opposed the re-election of President Ulysses S. Grant and the Radical Republicans who supported him, and under the name Liberal Republican Party nominated a joint ticket with the Democratic Party. At the State election in November 1872, 91 Republicans, 35 Democrats and 2 Independents were elected for the session of 1873 to the Assembly. The 96th New York State Legislature met from January 7 to May 30, 1873, at Albany, New York.

The caucus of Republican State legislators met on January 8, State Senator William B. Woodin, of Auburn (25th D.), presided. 18 state senators and 88 assemblymen were present. They re-nominated Conkling unanimously.  The caucus of the Democratic State legislators nominated Ex-First Judge of Dutchess County Charles Wheaton.

Roscoe Conkling was the choice of both the Assembly and the State Senate, and was declared elected.

Note: The vote for Ex-U.S. Attorney General William M. Evarts was cast by Norman M. Allen (32nd district), the vote for Ex-Judge of the New York Court of Appeals Henry R. Selden by Gabriel T. Harrower (27th  district). Allen, Harrower and Abiah W. Palmer (11th  district) were the three Liberal Republicans in the State Senate.

North Carolina

North Carolina (regular)

North Carolina (late)

Ohio

Oregon

Pennsylvania 

 
The Pennsylvania General Assembly, consisting of the Pennsylvania House of Representatives and the Pennsylvania State Senate, voted on January 21, 1873. Incumbent Republican Simon Cameron, who was elected in 1867, won re-election.

|-
| colspan=3 align=right | Totals
| align=right | 133
| align=right | 100.00%
|}

South Carolina

Vermont

Wisconsin

See also
 1872 United States elections
 1872–73 United States House of Representatives elections
 1872 United States presidential election
 42nd United States Congress
 43rd United States Congress

Notes

References

Sources 
 Party Division in the Senate, 1789-Present, via Senate.gov
 
 
 
Members of the 43rd United States Congress
ALBANY.; Unanimous Nomination of Roscoe Conkling for U.S. Senator in NYT on January 9, 1873
ALBANY.; Nomination of Roscoe Conkling as United States Senator in NYT on January 22, 1873
The Life and Letters of Roscoe Conkling: Orator, Statesman and Advocate by Alfred R. Conkling (page 449) [gives wrong date for governor's inauguration "January 6", the inauguration happens invariably on January 1; and adds non-existent middle initial "G."]
Pennsylvania Election Statistics: 1682-2006 from the Wilkes University Election Statistics Project